Willem "Wil" Dadema (born 1933) is a retired heavyweight judoka from the Netherlands. Between 1955 and 1963 he won four medals at European championships. He was a national champion in 1960 and 1961.

References

1933 births
Living people
Dutch male judoka